These 418 genera belong to the family Histeridae, clown beetles. There are at least 4,800 described species in Histeridae.

Histeridae genera

 Abaeletes Cooman, 1940
 Abraeomorphus Reitter, 1886
 Abraeus Leach, 1817
 Acritodes Cooman, 1935
 Acritomorphus Wenzel, 1944
 Acritus J. L. LeConte, 1853
 Acrolister Bickhardt, 1917
 Adelopygus Desbordes, 1917
 Aeletes Horn, 1873
 Aeletodes Gomy, 1977
 Aemulister Reichensperger, 1938
 Africanister Gomy, 2010
 Afrohister Mazur, 2006
 Afroprinus Lackner, 2013
 Afrosaprinus Vienna, 2015
 Afrosoma Mazur, 1999
 Alienister Reichensperger, 1926
 Alienocacculus Kanaar, 2008
 Alienodites Tishechkin, 2007
 Alloiodites Reichensperger, 1939
 Althanus Lewis, 1903
 Amiculus Dégallier & Bello, 2008
 Ammostyphrus Reichardt, 1924
 Amplectister Caterino & Maddison, 2018
 Anaglymma Lewis, 1894
 Anapleus Horn, 1873
 Anasynodites Reichensperger, 1935
 Aneuterapus Reichensperger, 1958
 Anophtaeletes Olexa, 1976
 Antongilus Gomy, 1969
 Aphanister Reichensperger, 1933
 Aphelosternus Wenzel in Arnett, 1962
 Apobletes Marseul, 1861
 Apobletodes Desbordes, 1918
 Arbolister Mazur, 1990
 Aristomorphus Lewis, 1913
 Aristonister Dégallier, 1998
 Aritaerius Kovarik & Tishechkin, 2004
 Arizonacritus Gomy & Warner, 2013
 Asiaster Cooman, 1948
 Asolenus Lewis, 1906
 Aspidolister Bickhardt, 1920
 Asterix Mazur, 1993
 Atholus C. Thomson, 1859
 Athomalus Mazur, 1993
 Atribalus Bickhardt, 1921
 Attalister Bruch, 1937
 Aulacosternus Marseul, 1853
 Australanius Gomy, 2009
 Australomalus Mazur, 1981
 Australopachylopus 
 Axelinus Kryzhanovskij, 1976
 Bacaniomorphus Mazur, 1989
 Bacanius J. L. LeConte, 1853
 Baconia Lewis, 1885
 Baeckmanniolus Reichardt, 1926
 Baekmanniolus 
 Barbarus Mazur, 2005
 Bastactister Reichensperger, 1939
 Blypotehus Vienna, 2000
 Brasilister Dégallier, 1999
 Bruchodites Tishechkin, 2007
 Cachexia Lewis, 1888
 Caenolister Bickhardt, 1921
 Caerosternus J. L. LeConte, 1852
 Campylorhabdus Schmidt, 1889
 Canarinus Mazur, 1993
 Carcinops Marseul, 1855
 Catacraerus Bickhardt, 1920
 Caterino 
 Ceratohister Reichensperger, 1924
 Chaetabraeus Portevin, 1929
 Chaetobacanius Gomy, 1977
 Chalcionellus Reichardt, 1932
 Chalcurgus H.Kolbe, 1897
 Chapischema Caterino & Tishechkin, 2014
 Cheilister Reichensperger, 1924
 Chelonarhister Dégallier, 2004
 Chelonosternus Bickhardt, 1909
 Chelyocephalus Schmidt, 1893
 Chelyoxenus Hubbard, 1894
 Chivaenius Olexa, 1980
 Chlamydonia Caterino, 2006
 Chlamydopsis Westwood, 1869
 Chrysetaerius Reichensperger, 1923
 Clientister Reichensperger, 1935
 Coelister Bickhardt, 1917
 Coelocraera Marseul, 1857
 Colonides Schmidt, 1889
 Conchita Mazur, 1994
 Conocassis Caterino & Tishechkin, 2014
 Contipus Marseul, 1854
 Convivister Reichensperger, 1936
 Coomanister Kryzhanovskij, 1972
 Coproxenus Lewis, 1897
 Coptosternus Lewis, 1914
 Coptotrophis Lewis, 1902
 Corticalinus Gomy, 2004
 Cossyphodister Reichensperger, 1936
 Crenulister Caterino & Tishechkin, 2014
 Cretonthophilus Caterino, Wolf-Schwenninger & Bechly, 2015
 Cryptomalus Mazur, 1993
 Ctenophilothis Kryzhanovskij, 1987
 Cyclechinus Bickhardt, 1917
 Cyclobacanius G.Müller, 1925
 Cylindrolister Bickhardt, 1921
 Cylister Cooman, 1941
 Cylistosoma Lewis, 1905
 Cypturus Erichson, 1834
 Dahlgrenius Penati & Vienna, 1996
 Daitrosister Helava, 1985
 Daptesister Helava, 1985
 Degallierister Gomy, 2001
 Dendrophilus Leach, 1817
 Desbordesia Mazur, 1999
 Diabletes Reichardt, 1933
 Diister Mazur, 1989
 Dimalus Marseul, 1870
 Diplostix Bickhardt, 1921
 Discoscelis Schmidt, 1889
 Dolicholister Bickhardt, 1917
 Eblisia Lewis, 1889
 Ebonius Lewis, 1885
 Ecclisister Reichensperger, 1935
 Ectatommiphila Lea, 1914
 Enicosoma Lewis, 1904
 Enkyosoma Caterino & Tishechkin, 2014
 Eopachylopus Reichardt, 1926
 Eosaprinus Kozminykh, 2000
 Epiechinus Lewis, 1891
 Epierus Erichson, 1834
 Epiglyptus Lewis, 1906
 Epitoxasia Cooman, 1932
 Epitoxus Lewis, 1900
 Epuraeosoma Slipinski & Mazur, 1999
 Erebidus Reichardt, 1941
 Eremosaprinus Ross, 1939
 Eretmotus Lacordaire, 1854
 Errabundus Mazur, 2006
 Eubrachium Wollaston, 1862
 Euclasea Lewis, 1888
 Eucurtia Mjöberg, 1912
 Eucurtiopsis Silvestri, 1926
 Eudiplister Reitter, 1909
 Eugrammicus Lewis, 1907
 Eulomalus Cooman, 1937
 Eurosoma Mazur & Ôhara, 2009
 Eurylister Bickhardt, 1920
 Eurysister Helava, 1985
 Euspilotus Lewis, 1907
 Eutidium Lewis, 1903
 Eutriptus Wollaston, 1862
 Euxenister Reichensperger, 1923
 Exaesiopus Reichardt, 1926
 Exorhabdus Lewis, 1910
 Exosternus Lewis, 1902
 Exotoxus Mazur, 1991
 Fistulaster Helava, 1985
 Geminorhabdus Mazur, 2007
 Geocolus Wenzel, 1944
 Geomysaprinus Ross, 1940
 Ghanister Mazur, 2005
 Globodiplostix Vienna & Yélamos, 2006
 Glymma Marseul, 1856
 Glyptosister Helava, 1985
 Gnathoncus Jacquelin-Duval, 1858
 Gomyopsis Dégallier, 1984
 Gomyoscelis Dégallier, 2001
 Gomyster Mazur, 1984
 Grammopeplus Bickhardt, 1911
 Guianahister Tishechkin, 2007
 Haeterius Dejean, 1833
 Halacritus Schmidt, 1893
 Helavadites Tishechkin, 2007
 Hemicolonides Reichensperger, 1939
 Hemisaprinus Kryzhanovskij, 1976
 Hesperodromus Schmidt, 1889
 Hetaeriobius Reichensperger, 1925
 Hetaeriodes Schmidt, 1893
 Hetaeriomorphus Schmidt, 1893
 Heudister Cooman, 1940
 Hindophelister Mazur, 1975
 Hippeutister Reichensperger, 1935
 Hister Linnaeus, 1758
 Hololepta Paykull, 1811  (clown beetles)
 Homalopygus Boheman, 1858
 Hubenthalia Bickhardt, 1918
 Hypobletus Schmidt, 1896
 Hypocacculus Bickhardt, 1914
 Hypocaccus C. Thomson, 1867
 Iarina Yélamos, 1996
 Iberacritus Yélamos, 1994
 Idister Marseul, 1880
 Idolia Lewis, 1885
 Iliotona Carnochan, 1917
 Indodiplostix Vienna, 2007
 Iridoprinus 
 Iugulister Reichensperger, 1958
 Juliettinus Gomy, 2010
 Kanaarister Mazur, 1999
 Kanakopsis Caterino, 2006
 Kaszabister Mazur, 1972
 Kissister Marseul, 1862
 Kleptisister Helava, 1985
 Lacrimorpha Caterino & Tishechkin, 2014
 Latinolister Mazur, 1999
 Latronister Reichensperger, 1932
 Leptosister Helava, 1985
 Lewisister Bickhardt, 1912
 Liopygus Lewis, 1891
 Lissosternus Lewis, 1905
 Macrosternus Marseul, 1853
 Malagasyprinus Lackner & Gomy, 2013
 Margarinotus Marseul, 1853
 Mascarenium Gomy, 1978
 Mecistostethus Marseul, 1870
 Megagnathos Penati & Zhang, 2009
 Megalocraerus Lewis, 1902
 Mendelius Lewis, 1908
 Merohister Reitter, 1909
 Mesostrix Mazur, 1994
 Mesynodites Reichardt, 1924
 Metasynodites Reichensperger, 1930
 Microlister Lewis, 1905
 Microsaprinus Kryzhanovskij, 1976
 Microsynodites Tishechkin, 2007
 Monachister Mazur, 1991
 Monoplius Lacordaire, 1854
 Monotonodites Reichensperger, 1939
 Morphetaerius Reichensperger, 1939
 Mullerister Cooman, 1936
 Murexus Lewis, 1907
 Mutodites Tishechkin, 2007
 Myrmetes Marseul, 1862
 Nagelius Lewis, 1909
 Nannolepidius Reichardt, 1932
 Nasaltus Mazur & Wegrzynowicz, 2008
 Neobacanius G.Müller, 1925
 Neocolonides Dégallier, 1998
 Neohister Desbordes, 1928
 Neopachylopus Reichardt, 1926
 Neosantalus Kryzhanovskij, 1972
 Neoterapus Dégallier, 2004
 Nevermannister Reichensperger, 1938
 Nicolasites Tishechkin, 2007
 Nicotikis Marseul, 1883
 Niponius Lewis, 1885
 Niposoma Mazur, 1999
 Nipponius 
 Nomadister Borgmeier, 1948
 Notocoelis Lewis, 1900
 Notodoma Lacordaire, 1854
 Notolister Lewis, 1894
 Notosaprinus Kryzhanovskij, 1972
 Nunbergia Mazur, 1978
 Nymphister Reichensperger, 1933
 Omalodes Erichson, 1834
 Omotropis Reichardt, 1933
 Onthophilus Leach, 1817
 Opadosister Helava, 1985
 Operclipygus Marseul, 1870
 Orateon Lackner & Ratto, 2014
 Orectoscelis Lewis, 1903
 Oxysternus Dejean, 1833
 Pachycraerus Marseul, 1854
 Pachylister Lewis, 1904
 Pachylomalus Schmidt, 1897
 Pachylopus Erichson, 1834
 Pacifister Mazur & Ôhara, 2009
 Pactolinus Motschulsky, 1859
 Panoplitellus Hedicke, 1923
 Papuopsis Caterino & Dégallier, 2007
 Parabraeus Müller, 1944
 Parahypocaccus Vienna, 1995
 Paramyrmetes Bruch, 1929
 Paraphilothis Vienna, 1994
 Parasynodites Bruch, 1930
 Paratropinus Reichensperger, 1923
 Paratropus Gerstaecker, 1867
 Paravolvulus Reichardt, 1932
 Parepierus Bickhardt, 1913
 Parodites Reichensperger, 1923
 Paroecister Reichensperger, 1923
 Paromalus Erichson, 1834
 Pelatetister Reichensperger, 1939
 Pelorurus Lacordaire, 1854
 Peploglyptus J. L. LeConte, 1880
 Perfidolenus Vienna, 2000
 Petalosoma Lewis, 1903
 Pheidoliphila Lea, 1914
 Phelister Marseul, 1853
 Philothis Reichardt, 1930
 Philoxenus Mazur, 1991
 Phloeolister Bickhardt, 1916
 Pholioxenus Reichardt, 1932
 Phoxonotus Marseul, 1862
 Pilisaprinus Kanaar, 1996
 Pinaxister Reichensperger, 1939
 Placodes Erichson, 1834
 Placodister Bickhardt, 1918
 Plaesius Erichson, 1834
 Plagiogramma Tarsia in Curia, 1935
 Plagioscelis Bickhardt, 1917
 Platybletes Thérond, 1952
 Platylister Lewis, 1892
 Platylomalus Cooman, 1948
 Platysoma Leach, 1817
 Platysomatinus Mazur, 1972
 Plaumannister Reichensperger, 1958
 Plegaderus Erichson, 1834
 Pleuroleptus G.Müller, 1937
 Pluricosta Caterino & Tishechkin, 2014
 Probolosternus Lewis, 1900
 Procolonides Reichensperger, 1935
 Procoryphaeus Mazur, 1984
 Psalidister Reichensperger, 1924
 Pselaphister Bruch, 1926
 Pseudepierus Casey, 1916
 Pseudister Bickhardt, 1917
 Psiloscelis Marseul, 1853
 Pterotister Reichensperger, 1939
 Pulvinister Reichensperger, 1933
 Pygocoelis Lewis, 1897
 Pyxister Caterino & Tishechkin, 2014
 Quasimodopsis Caterino & Dégallier, 2007
 Quassarus Mazur, 2007
 Reichardtia Wenzel, 1944
 Reichardtiolus Kryzhanovskij, 1959
 Reichenspergerites Tishechkin, 2007
 Renclasea Tishechkin & Caterino, 2009
 Reninoides Helava, 1985
 Reninopsis Helava, 1985
 Reninus Lewis, 1889
 Rhypochares Marseul, 1854
 Sabahister Gomy & Vienna, 2008
 Santalus Lewis, 1906
 Saprinillus Kryzhanovskij, 1974
 Saprinodes Lewis, 1891
 Saprinus Erichson, 1834
 Sarandibrinus Lackner & Gomy, 2014
 Sardulus Patrizi, 1955
 Satrapes Schmidt, 1885
 Satrapister Bickhardt, 1912
 Scaphidister Cooman, 1933
 Scapicoelis Marseul, 1862
 Scapolister Borgmeier, 1930
 Scapomegas Lacordaire, 1854
 Scaptorus Caterino & Tishechkin, 2014
 Sculptura Thérond, 1969
 Seitzister Cooman, 1948
 Sibelia Mazur & Ôhara, 2009
 Sigillum Thérond, 1975
 Silinus Lewis, 1907
 Sitalia Lewis, 1900
 Spathochus Marseul, 1864
 Spelaeabraeus Moro, 1957
 Spelaeacritus Jeannel, 1934
 Sphaericosoma Marseul, 1868
 Sphyracus Marseul, 1854
 Spilodiscus Lewis, 1906
 Sternocoelis Lewis, 1888
 Sternocoelopsis Reichensperger, 1923
 Sternoglyphus Desbordes, 1916
 Stictostix Marseul, 1870
 Strigister Caterino, Tishechkin & Proudfoot, 2013
 Styphrus Motschulsky, 1845
 Sunilis Mazur & Ôhara, 2009
 Symphilister Reichensperger, 1923
 Synetister Reichensperger, 1924
 Synoditinus Reichensperger, 1929
 Synoditulus Reichensperger, 1924
 Teinotarsus Marseul, 1864
 Terametopon Vienna, 1987
 Terapus Marseul, 1862
 Teratolister Bruch, 1930
 Teratosoma Lewis, 1885
 Teretriopsis Caterino & Dégallier, 2007
 Teretriosoma Horn, 1873
 Teretrius Erichson, 1834
 Termitolister Bruch, 1930
 Termitoxenus Schmidt, 1889
 Thaumataerius Mann, 1923
 Therondus Gomy, 1974
 Thoraxister Desbordes, 1922
 Tineatrix Mazur, 2006
 Tomogenius Marseul, 1862
 Tribalasia Cooman, 1941
 Triballodes Schmidt, 1885
 Tribalus Erichson, 1834
 Trichoreninus Lewis, 1891
 Troglobacanius Vomero, 1974
 Troglosternus Bickhardt, 1917
 Trypanaeus Eschscholtz, 1829
 Trypeticus Marseul, 1864
 Trypobius Schmidt, 1893
 Trypolister Bickhardt, 1916
 Tubulister Borgmeier, 1948
 Turanostyphrus Tishechkin, 2005
 Tylois Marseul, 1864
 Ulkeopsis Helava, 1985
 Ulkeus Horn, 1885
 Voratister Helava, 1989
 Vuattouxinus Thérond, 1964
 Vuattuoxinus Thérond, 1964
 Wasmannister Bruch, 1929
 Xenister Borgmeier, 1929
 Xenonychus Wollaston, 1864
 Xenophilothis Kryzhanovskij, 1987
 Xenosternus Bickhardt, 1911
 Xerosaprinus Wenzel in Arnett, 1962
 Xestipyge Marseul, 1862
 Xiphonotus Lacordaire, 1854
 Xylonaeus Lewis, 1902
 Yarmister Wenzel, 1939
 Zabromorphus Lewis, 1906
 Zorius Reichardt, 1932
 † Pantostictus Poinar & Brown, 2009
 † Theropatina Mazur, 1984

References